Hawayo Hiromi Takata (December 24, 1900 – December 11, 1980) was a Japanese-American woman born in Hanamaulu, Territory of Hawaii, who helped introduce the spiritual practice of Reiki to the Western World.

Takata was trained in Reiki by Chujiro Hayashi in Tokyo, Japan and became a Master Practitioner by 1940. Hayashi had learned from Mikao Usui, the first teacher of Reiki, in the early 1900s. Identification of training lineage is common among Reiki practitioners. Within the tradition, Takata is sometimes known as Reiki Grand Master Teacher Hawayo Takata.

Hawayo Takata, 79, of Keosauqua, died at 2.45 a.m. Thursday, Dec, 11, 1980, at Van Buren County Memorial Hospital, in Keosauqua, Iowa.

Further reading

References

1900 births
1980 deaths
People from Kauai County, Hawaii
American people of Japanese descent
Reiki practitioners